Mamma Roma is a 1962 Italian drama film written and directed by Pier Paolo Pasolini, starring Anna Magnani, Ettore Garofolo and Franco Citti.

Synopsis
After her pimp Carmine has gotten married, prostitute Mamma Roma starts a new life as a marketer in Rome to enable her 16-year-old son Ettore a better life. She finds him a job as a waiter by blackmailing a trattoria owner and tries to draw him away from his thieving friends and occasional streetwalker Bruna. When Mamma Roma is forced back into prostitution by Carmine and Ettore finds out about it, he returns to his previous habits. Caught during a theft in a hospital, Ettore dies in jail from a fever, leaving behind his grieving, desperate mother.

Cast
 Anna Magnani as Mamma Roma
 Ettore Garofolo as Ettore
 Franco Citti as Carmine
 Silvana Corsini as Bruna
 Luisa Loiano as Biancofiore
 Paolo Volponi as Priest
 Luciano Gonini as Zacaria

Production and release
Pasolini based his screenplay for Mamma Roma on the true case of Marcello Elisei, who had died in prison. Shooting began on 9 April 1962, with a cast that largely consisted of non-professionals. Pasolini, unhappy with Magnani's interpretation of the title role, expanded Citti's role of Carmine, but the production was temporarily halted when Citti was arrested for a petty crime.

On 31 August 1962, Mamma Roma premiered at the Venice Film Festival. On the same day, a police complaint was filed, claiming that the film was "offensive to good morals" and "contrary to public decency" for the language used, but the complaint was turned down by a magistrate five days later. On the night of the film's release in the Quattro Fontane Cinema in Rome on 22 September 1962, Pasolini was confronted with protesting neo-fascists and got involved in a scuffle. Mamma Roma also met with criticism from the left, and its domestic box office was a humble 168 million lira.

References

External links
 
 
 

1962 drama films
Italian black-and-white films
Films about prostitution in Italy
Films directed by Pier Paolo Pasolini
Films set in Rome
Italian independent films
Italian drama films
1962 independent films
1962 films
1960s Italian-language films
1960s Italian films